HMS Reynard was part of the 1847 Program, she was ordered on 25 April as a steam schooner from Deptford Dockyard with the name ‘Plumper’. However, the reference Ships of the Royal Navy, by J.J. College, © 2020, there is no entry that associates the name Plumper  to this build. The vessel was reordered on August 12th as an 8-gun sloop as designed by John Edye. She was launched in 1848, conducted anti-piracy work in Chinese waters and was wrecked near Pratas Island in the South China Sea on 31 May 1851.

Reynard was the seventh named vessel (spelt Renard or Reynard) since it was introduced for a 18-gun sloop captured from the French on May 1780 by HMS Brune in the West Indies and broken in 1784.

Construction
Reynard’s keel was laid in August 1847 at Deptford Dockyard and launched on 21 March 1848. She had a depth of hold of 14 feet 6 inches . Her builder’s measure tonnage was 516 tons and displaced 656 tons.

Her machinery was supplied by George & John Rennie. She shipped two rectangular fire tube boilers. She had a single  screw propeller.

Her main armament consisted of two Blomefield 32-pounder 56 hundredweight (cwt) muzzle loading smooth bore (MLSB)  solid shot guns and six Blomefield (bored up from 18-pounders) 32-pounder 25 cwt MLSB 6-foot  solid shot guns on broadside trucks. The 56 cwt guns had a 6.41 inch bore whereas the 25 cwt guns had a bore of 6.3. Both fired a 32-pound solid shot.

Trials
During steam trials her engine generated 165 indicated horsepower (IHP) for a speed of 8.238 knots.

Reynard was completed for sea on the 1st of August 1848 at a cost for hull £10,262 and machinery and fitting £8,625.

Commissioned Service

She was commissioned on 4 July 1848 at Woolwich under Commander Peter Cracroft, RN for Particular Service with Sir Charles Napier’s Western Squadron.  On 15 September 1848, she ran aground at Cobh, County Cork. She was refloated. Reynard took part in an abortive amphibious landing against Riff pirates in February 1849.

She served on the China Station in an anti-piracy role, recapturing two junks and apprehending 15 Chinese pirates on 23 March 1850.

Fate
In rescuing the crew of Velocipede, Reynard herself was wrecked near Pratas Island in the South China Sea on 31 May 1851. The whole crew survived the sinking. HMS Pilot rescued them and also the crew of Velocipede. Reynard could not be saved, and she was paid off as a total loss on 27 February 1852.

Notes

References
 Lyon Winfield, The Sail & Steam Navy List, All the Ships of the Royal Navy 1815 to 1889, by David Lyon & Rif Winfield, published by Chatham Publishing, London © 2004, 
 The Navy List, published by His Majesty's Stationery Office, London
 Winfield, British Warships in the Age of Sail (1817 – 1863), by Rif Winfield, published by Seaforth Publishing, England © 2014, e, Chapter 12 Screw Sloops, Vessels ordered or reordered as steam screw sloops (from 1845), Reynard
 Colledge, Ships of the Royal Navy, by J.J. Colledge, revised and updated by Lt Cdr Ben Warlow and Steve Bush, published by Seaforth Publishing, Barnsley, Great Britain, © 2020, e  (EPUB), Section P (Plumper, Renard, Reynard)

 

Victorian-era sloops of the United Kingdom
Sloops of the Royal Navy
Ships built in Deptford
1848 ships
Maritime incidents in September 1848
Maritime incidents in May 1851
Shipwrecks in the South China Sea